Kalynivka is an urban-type settlement in Fastiv Raion (district) of Kyiv Oblast (region) in northern Ukraine. It hosts the administration of Kalynivka settlement hromada, one of the hromadas of Ukraine. Its population was 5,704 as of 2001 Ukrainian Census. Current population: .

Until 18 July 2020, Kalynivka belonged to Vasylkiv Raion. The raion was abolished that day as part of the administrative reform of Ukraine, which reduced the number of raions of Kyiv Oblast to seven. The area of Vasylkiv Raion was split between Bila Tserkva, Fastiv, and Obukhiv Raions, with Kalynivka being transferred to Fastiv Raion.

References

Urban-type settlements in Fastiv Raion
Populated places established in 1957
Kyiv metropolitan area